Canada competed at the 1956 Summer Olympics in Melbourne, Australia and Stockholm, Sweden (equestrian events). 92 competitors, 77 men and 15 women, took part in 81 events in 14 sports.

Medalists

Gold
 Archibald MacKinnon, Kenneth Loomer, Walter D'Hondt, and Donald Arnold in Rowing, men's Coxless Four
 Gerald Ouellette in Shooting, men's 50m Rifle Prone

Silver
 Philip Kueber, Richard McClure, Robert Wilson, David Helliwell, Wayne Pretty, Bill McKerlich, Douglas McDonald, Lawrence West, Carlton Ogawa – Rowing, men's eight with coxswain

Bronze
 Irene MacDonald – Diving, women's 3m springboard
 Stuart Boa – Shooting, men's 50m Rifle Prone
 John Rumble, James Elder, Brian Herbinson – Equestrian, Team Three-Day Event

Athletics

Basketball

Boxing

Canoeing

Cycling

Sprint
Fred Markus – 17th place

Time trial
James Davies – 1:15.2 (→ 17th place)

Individual road race
Patrick Murphy – 5:27:28 (→ 29th place)
Fred Markus – did not finish (→ no ranking)
James Davies – did not finish (→ no ranking)

Diving

Men's 10m platform
William Patrick
 Preliminary round – 67.71 (→ did not advance, 15th place)

Fencing

One fencer represented Canada in 1956.

Men's foil
 Roland Asselin

Men's épée
 Roland Asselin

Men's sabre
 Roland Asselin

Gymnastics

Rowing

Canada had 13 male rowers participate in two out of seven rowing events in 1956.

 Men's coxless four
 Archibald MacKinnon
 Lorne Loomer
 Walter D'Hondt
 Donald Arnold

 Men's eight
 Philip Kueber
 Richard McClure
 Robert Wilson
 David Helliwell
 Wayne Pretty
 Bill McKerlich
 Douglas McDonald
 Lawrence West
 Carlton Ogawa (cox)

Sailing

Shooting

Five shooters represented Canada in 1956. In the 50 m rifle, prone event, Gerald Ouellette won gold and Gil Boa won bronze.

25 m pistol
 James Zavitz

50 m pistol
 James Zavitz

300 m rifle, three positions
 Gerald Ouellette

50 m rifle, three positions
 Gil Boa
 Gerald Ouellette

50 m rifle, prone
 Gil Boa
 Gerald Ouellette

Trap
 Earl Caldwell
 Frank Opsal

Swimming

Weightlifting

Wrestling

References

Nations at the 1956 Summer Olympics
1956
Summer Olympics